Asch is a village in the Dutch province of Gelderland. It is a part of the municipality of Buren, and lies about 9 km northwest of Tiel.

It was first mentioned in 889 as Alke. The etymology is unclear. In 1335, there was a chapel in Asch. Around 1518, a church was built. In 1820, Asch was flooded, and the church was abandoned in favour of neighbouring Buren. In 1823, the tower was demolished, and the church was turned into a shelter for high water. In 1839, a new church constructed. In 1840, it was home to 1840 people.

Gallery

References

Populated places in Gelderland
Buren